Hollond is a surname. Notable people with the surname include:

 Henry Arthur Hollond (1884–1974), professor and army officer
 John Robert Hollond (1843–1912), politician 
 Robert Hollond (1808–1877), English balloonist and politician
 Spencer Edmund Hollond (1874–1950), British Army officer

See also
 Holland (disambiguation)